Jonny Hill (born 8 June 1994) is an English professional rugby union player who plays at lock for Premiership club Sale Sharks. Hill is the nephew of former Rugby league international Paul Loughlin.

Career

Club
Hill first started playing rugby at local club Luctonians. He represented Gloucester on two occasions in the Anglo-Welsh Cup. On 21 June 2015 it was announced that he would leave Gloucester to join their rivals Exeter Chiefs. In the 2019 Premiership final he scored a try as Exeter were defeated by Saracens. The following year Hill started in both the Premiership and European Rugby Champions Cup finals as Exeter defeated Wasps and Racing 92 to complete a League and European double.

In December 2021, it was announced that Hill will be joining Sale Sharks for the 2022 season.

International
Hill represented the England under-20 team twice during the 2014 Six Nations Under 20s Championship and was selected for the 2014 IRB Junior World Championship however an ankle injury prevented his involvement.

Hill was selected in England's 34 man squad for their 2018 summer tour of South Africa and was an unused substitute in the third and final Test. On 31 October 2020 he made his England debut, pairing with Maro Itoje in the second row, in England's delayed final Six Nations match away to Italy, which England won to become the 2020 Six Nations champions. In December 2020 Hill came off the bench for England as they defeated France in extra-time to win the Autumn Nations Cup. He scored his first International try against Italy during the 2021 Six Nations Championship.

In May 2021 coach Warren Gatland included Hill in his squad for the 2021 British & Irish Lions tour to South Africa. He did not participate in any of the Test series but did score a try in a tour match against the Stormers.

In a match against the Wallabies on 2nd July 2022, Hill was given a Yellow Card for pulling the hair of his opponent lock Darcy Swain. He was lucky to escape further sanctions by the citing committee despite hair pulling being illegal according to the World Rugby rule book, with one commentator remarking that he "better keep his suit fresh", implying a likely judicial hearing. The Wallabies went on to win the match, scoring multiple tries and gaining the lead while Hill was serving his Yellow Card. He was labelled an "English villain" in the Australian press as a result of the incident.

International tries

Honours
England
 Six Nations Championship: 2020
 Autumn Nations Cup: 2020

Club
 European Rugby Champions Cup: 2019–2020
 Premiership: 2019–2020
 Premiership runner up: 2017–2018, 2018–2019, 2020–2021

References

External links
 
Ultimate Rugby profile

1994 births
Living people
British & Irish Lions rugby union players from England
England international rugby union players
English rugby union players
Exeter Chiefs players
Gloucester Rugby players
Rugby union locks
Rugby union players from Ludlow
Sale Sharks players